In the Raw may refer to:

In the Raw (Jaya album), 1997
In the Raw (Tarja album), 2019
In the Raw (film), a 2009 documentary film
"In the Raw" (song), a song by Crashdïet